Quidi Vidi Formation is an Ediacaran stratigraphic unit consisting of red sandstone deposited on an alluvial plain.

References

Ediacaran Newfoundland and Labrador